Consuelo Zavala Castillo (1874-1956) was a Mexican feminist teacher, and founder of one of the first secular private schools in Mérida, Mexico. She is credited with establishing the first kindergarten to utilize the Froebel method in Mérida. She was the organizer of the First Feminist Congress in Mexico authorized by state governor Salvador Alvarado.

Biography
Consuelo Zavala Castillo was born in 1874 in Mérida, Yucatán, Mexico. She studied at the Instituto Literario de Niñas (ILN) (Literary Institute for Girls) under the feminist teachings of Rita Cetina Gutiérrez. She graduated at the age of 23 with a degree in elementary and higher education. After teaching at various schools in the state in 1902 founded her own school basing the curriculum on secular, scientific education methods. In 1904, Zavala participated in the 5th General Congress on Primary Education.

In 1906, she established the first professional kindergarten in Yucatán, following the Frobel principals. In 1912, she was commissioned to study in France by president Francisco I. Madero to learn more about European educational models.

She was President of the Board of Directors for the Organizing Committee of the First Feminist Congress in Mexico held in 1916, driven by the Governor of Yucatán, Salvador Alvarado. Numerous topics were discussed at the January meeting, but at the center of the discussion was suffrage and political involvement of all citizens, followed by women's education and women's roles as wives, mothers and their rights to divorce. A storm of controversy resulted when Hermila Galindo's paper advocating sexual education and female sexuality was read. When the second congress was held in December of that same year, Zavala who had been surprised by the amount of anti-feminist feeling that emanated from the first congress, did not attend.

In 1922, Zavala helped found the Feminist League of Yucatán, as part of the Socialist Party of the Southeast with Elvia Carrillo Puerto, Raquel Dzib Cicero, Rosa Torre González, Beatríz Peniche de Ponce and Adolfina Valencia. One of her students, Antonia Jiménez Trava, became the first female lawyer to graduate with a law degree in Yucatán in 1939.

In 1948, she was awarded the Ignacio Manuel Altamirano Medal, for fifty years of educating, for her distinguished teaching career.

Zavala died 22 June 1956 in Mérida.

There are six schools in Mexico that bear her name:  three in the city of Mérida, one in Akil, Yucatán, one in Kanasín and one in Tizimín.

References 

1874 births
1956 deaths
Mexican women's rights activists
Mexican feminists
Mexican educators
People from Mérida, Yucatán
20th-century Mexican educators